Abderrahim Mettour is a French-Moroccan filmmaker and editor.

Filmography

Feature films

As director 

 2007: Casanayda! (with Farida Benlyazid)

As editor 

 2007: Nuba of Gold and Light

References 

Moroccan film directors
Living people

Year of birth missing (living people)